Chrysodeixis taiwani is a moth of the family Noctuidae. It is found in Taiwan.

References

Moths described in 1974
Plusiinae
Moths of Japan